Denticollis is a genus of beetles belonging to the family Elateridae.

The species of this genus are found in Eurasia and Northern America.

Species:
 Denticollis linearis (Linnaeus, 1758)

References

Elateridae
Elateridae genera